William T. Bielby is a professor of sociology at the University of Illinois at Chicago and is Distinguished Research Scholar at the School of Sociology at the University of Arizona.  He was the President of the American Sociological Association in 2002–2003. He studied electrical engineering at the University of Illinois at Urbana-Champaign, and earned his doctorate in sociology from the University of Wisconsin–Madison. He was on the faculty of University of California, Santa Barbara from 1977 to 2004, where he served as chair of the Department of Sociology for six years.  From 2005 to 2007 he was Undergraduate Chair in the Department of Sociology at the University of Pennsylvania.

He has used the social framework analysis methodology to conclude that two aspects of Wal-Mart's culture, centralized personnel policy and managerial subjective decision making in the field, led to “decisions about compensation and promotion" to be vulnerable to gender bias.

External links
Profile of William T. Bielby by the American Sociological Association
William Bielby, Ph.D.: Professor of Sociology - University of Illinois at Chicago faculty page
New York Times article about Bielby's expert testimony in Dukes v. Wal-Mart
Bielby's band, Thin Vitae, at the American Sociological Association Meetings, August 2003

American sociologists
Presidents of the American Sociological Association
University of Wisconsin–Madison alumni
Living people
Year of birth missing (living people)